Ronald John Cerrudo (born February 4, 1945) is an American professional golfer who currently works as a club teaching professional and formerly played on the PGA Tour.

Cerrudo was born in Palo Alto, California. He attended Chabot Community College and San Jose State University, and was a member of the golf team at both institutions. He was a two-time All-American at San Jose State and played on the Walker Cup team in 1967. He finished runner-up in the 1967 British Amateur, losing 2 & 1 to fellow American Bob Dickson.

Cerrudo turned pro and joined the PGA Tour in 1967. He played on the PGA Tour from 1967–1979. He won two events: the 1968 Cajun Classic Open Invitational and the 1970 San Antonio Open Invitational. His best finish in a major was a T-21 at the 1969 PGA Championship.

Since 1979, Cerrudo has been employed as a club teaching professional at various clubs in South Carolina. From 1979–1996, he was the head teaching pro at Shipyard Golf Club on Hilton Head Island, South Carolina.
From 1996–2002, he was the head teaching pro at Port Royal Golf Club also on Hilton Head. Since 2002, he has been the Director of Instruction for The Ron Cerrudo Learning Center at the Daniel Island Club in Charleston, South Carolina. He has also done some on-course commentator radio work, and has been the featured speaker at various corporate outings.

Amateur wins (5)
1961 California Junior Championship
1962 California Junior Championship
1964 Santa Clara County Championship, California Amateur Northern Regionals, California Amateur Championship

Professional wins (4)

PGA Tour wins (2)

Other wins (2)
1972 Moroccan Open
1992 Carolinas PGA Championship

U.S. national team appearances
Amateur
Eisenhower Trophy: 1966
Walker Cup: 1967 (winners)

See also 

 1967 PGA Tour Qualifying School graduates

References

External links

American male golfers
San Jose State Spartans men's golfers
PGA Tour golfers
Golfers from California
Sportspeople from Palo Alto, California
1945 births
Living people